The Citizen was a six-day-a-week, morning daily newspaper in Laconia, New Hampshire, United States, and it was the largest paid subscription local paper serving the Lakes Region of that state. It was owned since 2010 by Sample News Group of Huntingdon, Pennsylvania, and managed by Eagle Printing & Publishing of Claremont, New Hampshire.

The paper suspended publication with its edition of September 30, 2016, citing rising costs in printing and production and inability to find a buyer for the newspaper.

History 
The Citizen was formerly an afternoon paper called the Laconia Evening Citizen and was launched by former Laconia Mayor Edward J. Gallagher in 1926. It was owned by Gallagher's daughter, Alma Gallagher Smith, and her husband, Lawrence J. Smith, following Edward Gallagher's death in 1978. The Smiths operated the newspaper until the Geo. J. Foster Company purchased the paper on May 10, 1991. Foster was the publisher of Foster's Daily Democrat in Dover, New Hampshire. 

In the late 1990s, the Foster Company launched Foster's Sunday Citizen as a joint venture by Foster's Daily Democrat and The Citizen, neither of which previously had a Sunday edition.

In November 2006, The Citizen converted to morning publication; Foster's followed a year later. The company made the change in order to compete with nearby papers such as the New Hampshire Union Leader and the Concord Monitor.

The Foster Company announced on June 23, 2010, that it would sell the paper on June 26, in order to concentrate on their main property, Foster's Daily Democrat. The company said it would continue to print The Citizen and the Laconia edition of the Sunday Citizen at its presses for at least the next three months. The new owner was Sample News Group, publisher of multiple daily and weekly newspapers across the northeastern United States. Sample News Group also owns and operates The Eagle Times of Claremont, in New Hampshire.

Features 
The "Citizen Weekender" on Saturday features a "local" section, which includes the "History" section, a look back at Laconia from 125, 100, 75, 50, 25, and 10 years ago with articles from local newspapers of that time, as well as an old photograph of an area in Laconia (including Weirs Beach and Lakeport) with a description below it, then a current picture of the same area with an updated view. The newspaper also features a weekly roundup online called "Busted in Belknap" which is a photo gallery of individuals who have been arrested and incarcerated at the Belknap County Jail.

Footnotes 

Newspapers published in New Hampshire
Belknap County, New Hampshire
Laconia, New Hampshire